The Sisterhood of the Traveling Pants 2 is a 2008 American comedy-drama film and a sequel to the 2005 film The Sisterhood of the Traveling Pants. The original cast (Amber Tamblyn, America Ferrera, Blake Lively and Alexis Bledel) return to star in the film. It was directed by Sanaa Hamri and written by Elizabeth Chandler, who wrote the previous film. The film is based upon the fourth novel in the book series: Forever in Blue (2007), but incorporates scenes and storylines from The Second Summer of the Sisterhood (2003) and Girls in Pants (2004).

It is the second installment of The Sisterhood of the Traveling Pants film series and was released in theaters on August 6, 2008.

Plot
Best childhood friends Bridget Vreeland, Lena Kaligaris, Tibby Rollins, and Carmen Lowell have completed their first year of college and will spend their summer apart.

Bridget discovers her father had hidden letters from her grandmother Greta and doesn't accept that it was to protect her. She goes to Turkey to participate in an archaeological dig under Professor Nasrin Mehani. Finding remains of a woman who died at the same age as Bridget's mother saddens her.

After reading her grandmother's letters, Bridget leaves the dig to visit her in Alabama. She learns her mother, who committed suicide, had denied having depression or any mental issues at all. Not allowing anyone into her life who challenged this or got her help, Bridget's father went along with it. But Greta could not, and moved away because her daughter wouldn't accept help.

Greta tells Bridget her mother was sick and her suicide was not her father's fault, saying she is 'stronger' than her so will not be sick like her. Bridget thinks her mother should have stayed alive for her sake and feels unloved/ abandoned. Greta says that her mother's love for Bridget is why she hung on as long as she did. It allows Bridget to later reconcile with her father.

While mourning the death of her grandfather Bapi in Greece, Lena meets her ex-boyfriend Kostas, who reveals he is married and expecting a baby with his wife. Lena returns to the Rhode Island School of Design and begins dating Leo, the model for her life class. Kostas comes to see her, revealing that his marriage was annulled after his wife revealed that she had lied about being pregnant. Lena forgives him but refuses to take him back because she says they have changed. However, after spending time with Leo, she realizes they are incompatible and she still cares for Kostas.

Tibby works at a video store in New York while retaking a screenwriting class at New York University that requires her to finish her script. While having sex with her boyfriend Brian, the condom breaks. Afraid that she might be pregnant, Tibby withdraws from everyone. Breaking up with Brian, she reluctantly gives Lena's younger sister Effie permission to date him, despite the age difference.

Lena brings Tibby a requested pregnancy test, but she gets her period before needing it. Tibby drives to Vermont, hoping for Carmen's support, but leaves after they argue over who ignores who more. She goes to Brian's and apologizes, confessing she had been afraid dealing with change. Realizing he still loves Tibby, he breaks up with Effie.

Carmen attends an actor workshop in Vermont, prompted by fellow Yale student and friend Julia. During auditions for The Winter's Tale, Ian, an actor, encourages Carmen to try out. She ultimately wins the part of Perdita, causing Julia to become envious. Carmen grows more confident when her talent is seen by the director Bill and the other actors, including Ian, with whom she begins a flirtatious friendship.

One night, Julia says she is going on a date with Ian, upsetting Carmen and causing her to falter in rehearsals. When her mother Christina goes into labor early, Carmen reconciles with Tibby and asks her to help. Ian comforts Carmen, revealing he only went out with Julia because she begged.

Carmen overhears Julia tell Bill to replace her saying she doesn’t have what it takes, but he refuses. Regaining her confidence, she performs successfully, and kisses Ian after the play. While packing to leave, she chastises Julia for her backstabbing, ending their friendship.

Effie, upset with Brian breaking up with her and how Lena seems to love her friends more than her own sister, steals the Pants and loses them in Greece while visiting her grandmother. Bridget, Lena, Tibby, and Carmen disagree if the Pants are worth saving, so Lena travels to Greece to look for them.

Discovering from Effie that Lena refused to take Kostas back when he visited her in Rhode Island, the other three follow with Carmen's stepdad's almost expired frequent flier miles to help search for the Pants and convince Lena to give Kostas a second chance. Lena sees Kostas and he says he has a place to study at the London School of Economics, but they part. Later, Lena looks for Kostas on his boat and they kiss.

Although they do not find the Pants, the summer ends in Greece with the four friends renewing their mutual commitment to each other.

Cast
 Amber Tamblyn as Tibby Rollins
 Alexis Bledel as Lena Kaligaris
 America Ferrera as Carmen Lowell
 Blake Lively as Bridget Vreeland
 Michael Rady as Kostas Dounas
 Leonardo Nam as Brian McBrian
 Jesse Williams as Leo
 Tom Wisdom as Ian
 Lucy Hale as Effie Kaligaris, Lena's younger sister
 Rachel Nichols as Julia Beckwith
 Shohreh Aghdashloo as Prof. Nasrin Mehani
 Blythe Danner as Greta Randolph, Bridget's maternal grandmother
 Rachel Ticotin as Christina
 Ernie Lively as Franz Vreeland, Bridget's father
 Carly Rose Sonenclar as Katherine Rollins
 Maria Konstandarou as Yia Yia, Lena's maternal grandmother
 Kyle MacLachlan as Bill Kerr (uncredited)

Production
Principal photography started on June 3, 2007. Filming began on the island of Santorini, Greece in Oia and continued in Connecticut. Western Connecticut State University was used for the scenes of Lena at the Rhode Island School of Design campus. Tibby's scenes were filmed in New York City.

Soundtrack and score

Rock & Roll - Eric Hutchinson
Together - Michelle Branch
Sunset Man - James Otto
No One's Aware - Jack Savoretti
Warm Whispers - Missy Higgins
Friday Night - Craig David
Sister Rosetta (Capture the Spirit) - Noisettes
5 times out of 100 - Hot Hot Heat
Girls Just Want To Have Fun - Cyndi Lauper
You Are Mine - Mutemath
Strange & Beautiful - Aqualung

In addition, Varèse Sarabande released an album of the film's score, composed by Rachel Portman (unlike the film's stars, composer Cliff Eidelman did not return for the sequel).

 Sisterhood (3:29)
 Kostas (:44)
 Carmen And Ian Rehearse (2:39)
 Welcome Home (1:07)
 Bridget (3:20)
 The Letters (2:43)
 Lena (4:14)
 Tibby (4:07)
 Carmen (3:52)
 Well Worn Pair Of Pants (1:39)

Reception
On Rotten Tomatoes, the film has a 65% approval rating based on 98 reviews with an average rating of 6/10. The site's critical consensus reads "The workable chemistry among the four leads combined with the enriching message make for a winning Sisterhood of the Traveling Pants 2". Similarly, Metacritic gave the film a 63/100 score based on 26 reviews, indicating "generally favorable reviews". Audiences polled by CinemaScore gave the film an average grade of "A-" on an A+ to F scale.

On its opening weekend, the film performed better than its predecessor, opening #4 at the box office with $10,678,430. As of November 7, 2008, the film had grossed $44,080,484 domestically.

DVD release
The DVD and Blu-ray were released in the United States on November 18, 2008. In Australia, the film was released straight-to-DVD.

Awards
2009 - Nominated; Teen Choice Award for Choice Movie: Romance

Sequel
A film based on the book sequel to The Sisterhood of the Traveling Pants 2, had been announced and it was produced by Alloy Entertainment. However as of 2022 there has been no update about this possible sequel.

References

External links
 

2008 films
2000s buddy comedy-drama films
2000s coming-of-age comedy-drama films
2000s female buddy films
2008 romantic comedy-drama films
2000s teen comedy-drama films
2000s teen romance films
Alcon Entertainment films
Alloy Entertainment films
American buddy comedy-drama films
American coming-of-age comedy-drama films
American female buddy films
American romantic comedy-drama films
American sequel films
American teen comedy-drama films
American teen romance films
Coming-of-age romance films
2000s English-language films
Films about vacationing
Films based on multiple works of a series
Films based on young adult literature
Films directed by Sanaa Hamri
Films produced by Denise Di Novi
Films scored by Rachel Portman
Films set in Alabama
Films set in Greece
Films set in New York City
Films set in Rhode Island
Films set in Turkey
Films set in Vermont
Films shot in Connecticut
Films shot in New York City
Films shot in Santorini
The Sisterhood of the Traveling Pants (film series)
Warner Bros. films
2000s American films